Jenny-May Clarkson (born Jenny-May Coffin; 9 April 1974) is a New Zealand netball player, sports commentator and television presenter. 

Clarkson previously played for the Silver Ferns, New Zealand's national netball team, for which she was the vice-captain in 2001. She also played for the Waikato Bay of Plenty Magic in the National Bank Cup between 1998–2004 and the Auckland Diamonds in 2007; she also played one season in the ANZ Championship in 2008 for the Southern Steel, and was signed to play with the Northern Mystics in 2010. 

Since 2005, Clarkson has been a sports commentator and news presenter for TVNZ and Māori Television. She currently co-hosts Breakfast with Matty Mclean and Indira Stewart.

Early life
Jenny-May Coffin was born in Te Kuiti, New Zealand. She was the youngest of six children raised by Waka and Paddy Coffin in Piopio, close to Mokaukohunui marae. Her father's parents were Charlie Coffin, a Pakeha, and Harata, a Maori.

International netball
Jenny-May Coffin played for the Silver Ferns from 1997–2002. She was vice-captain in 2001, and represented the Silver Ferns at the 2002 Commonwealth Games. She made 26 caps for the Ferns before retiring from international netball at the end of 2002.

Domestic netball
Jenny-May Coffin has been playing in New Zealand domestic netball leagues since 1995 and the National Bank Cup since 1998. She started playing for the Waikato/Bay of Plenty Magic in 1998 and in 2000 was appointed captain. She left the Magic in 2004, going into retirement and worked as a sports presenter on TVNZ. She returned to netball in 2006 and played in the National Championships before playing in the Auckland Diamonds as captain in 2007. With the National Bank Cup replaced by the ANZ Championship in 2008, Coffin was signed with the Southern Steel on a two-year contract. However, she pulled out of the team after the first season to focus on her television career. Coffin announced her return to competitive netball in October 2009, signing with the Northern Mystics for the 2010 ANZ Championship season.

Broadcasting
Clarkson first joined TVNZ in 2005 as the netball commentator for the National Bank Cup on ONE Sport. In March of that year she was announced as the weekend sports presenter and sports producer during the weekdays. In 2006, she regained her role on ONE Sport and she rejoined the netball commentating team. In 2007, she played for the Auckland Diamonds netball team. She presented sport on TV One on Mondays and Tuesdays, and commentated some National Bank Cup games. She was a news presenter on TVNZ 7 before TVNZ dropped the station.

Clarkson replaced Daniel Faitaua as the news presenter on Breakfast on TVNZ 1 in September 2019. In August 2020 she succeeded Hayley Holt as co-presenter, alongside John Campbell.

Controversy
In April 2018 after the Silver Ferns failed to qualify for a medal at the Commonwealth Games, the broadcasters remarks about having pride in the black dress to the current captain Katrina Rore were commented as being too harsh

Personal life 
Clarkson married Dean Clarkson in 2015; the couple had twin sons in 2016.

See also
List of New Zealand television personalities

References

External links
2010 Northern Mystics profile
2010 ANZ Championship profile

1974 births
Living people
New Zealand netball players
New Zealand television presenters
New Zealand international netball players
Northern Mystics players
Southern Steel players
Waikato Bay of Plenty Magic players
Auckland Diamonds players
ANZ Championship players
Commonwealth Games silver medallists for New Zealand
New Zealand Māori netball players
Sportspeople from Te Kūiti
Commonwealth Games medallists in netball
Netball players at the 2002 Commonwealth Games
New Zealand women television presenters
New Zealand netball commentators
Northern Mystics coaches
National Bank Cup players
Medallists at the 2002 Commonwealth Games